Andre-Joël Sami (born 13 November 1984) is a former professional footballer who played as a centre-back. Born in France, he made five appearances for the DR Congo national team.

career
Sami was born in Montfermeil, Seine-Saint-Denis.

He was on trial at Leeds United during the 2003–04 pre-season and even appeared on the team photo. However, he did not sign for them and went on to have a trial with Bolton Wanderers on the recommendation of then Leeds United manager Peter Reid.

He made his first cap for Congo DR national football team against Algeria on 26 March 2008.

References
 
 

1984 births
Living people
People from Montfermeil
French sportspeople of Democratic Republic of the Congo descent
Black French sportspeople
Democratic Republic of the Congo footballers
French footballers
Footballers from Seine-Saint-Denis
Association football defenders
Democratic Republic of the Congo international footballers
Ligue 1 players
Ligue 2 players
Belgian Pro League players
Joel Sami
ASOA Valence players
Amiens SC players
AS Nancy Lorraine players
S.V. Zulte Waregem players
US Orléans players
Joel Sami
Joel Sami
Democratic Republic of the Congo expatriate footballers
Democratic Republic of the Congo expatriate sportspeople in Belgium
Expatriate footballers in Belgium
Democratic Republic of the Congo expatriate sportspeople in Thailand
Expatriate footballers in Thailand